Faulbach is a river of Bavaria, Germany. The Faulbach is a tributary of the river Main.

See also
List of rivers of Bavaria

References

Rivers of Bavaria
Rivers of the Spessart
Rivers of Germany